Stock in the Channel is an IT channel and website which is a vertical search engine for MSPs, IT resellers and VARs.

History 
Stock in the Channel was founded in 2009 by brothers Tony and Paul Meyers. It is headquartered in London, UK and has over 50,000 registered users.

References 

Websites
Information technology organisations based in the United Kingdom